is a Japanese manga series written and illustrated by  and serialized in Comic BonBon in 1998. It was adapted into an anime television series which aired on NHK-BS2 satellite channel from December 11, 2001 to June 25, 2002. It also received two Game Boy Color video games released in 1999 in Japan, as well as a WonderSwan game.

In the United States the anime was dubbed by 4Kids Entertainment in cooperation with Enoki Films; Enoki Films held the license and contracted the dubbing to 4Kids. This show originally aired on the FoxBox on September 14, 2002, (later known as 4Kids TV) and was discontinued from their lineup on August 30, 2003. The Chinese version was premiered as Kung Fu Snacks (功夫小食神 Gōngfu xiǎo shíshén) and it aired on TVB Jade in Hong Kong. It had also aired on Fairchild TV in Canada starting on May 22, 2005.

The series was released on DVD by Discotek Media on April 25, 2017.

Its English dub's theme song is based on Jacques Offenbach's Orpheus in the Underworld.

Plot
It all started some years ago when a culinary-confused king asked a question to his chefs. Which would be stronger: tofu surprise or stuffed duck? The king's chefs thought the king had "gone a little too heavy on the nutmeg." One mysterious chef knew what the king was talking about and presented him with magical cards called Meal Tickets which turns the food into monsters called Fighting Foodons. Since that day, regular food recipes have been turned into Foodons when the art of culinary combat is concocted.

One day, King Gorgeous Gorge and his Gluttons cook up a devious plan to rule the world and they sprinkled an extra dash of destruction. They plan to rule the world by kidnapping the best chefs & forcing them to make powerful, evil Foodons. A boy named Chase, a young apprentice chef with an appetite for action, thinks he has what it takes to become an Elite Master Chef like his dad Chef Jack. Chase believes that he, his friends, family, and Foodons can change the world, one at a time, even if it involves going into battle against the Glutton Gormandizers, King Gorge's Big 4, and King Gorge's female cat-like servant Clawdia. Then, he'd have a final showdown with King Gorge.

Characters

Protagonists
  / Chase
 
 The main protagonist of the series. Chase is a 10-year-old, impatient chef-in-training from Yokohoma. He's the son of Chef Jack and the brother of Kayla. He trains under the Foodon guru Oslo to make more Foodons so that he would become a Master Chef like his dad. His Foodons are Fried Ricer (who turns into Super Fried Ricer when with Fruit Turtle or Feastavus), Hot Doggone-It, Burnt Meatballs who are usually out, Shrimp Daddy, Dim-Sumthin' Special, Fruit Turtle, and Feastivus (a Deluxe Foodon fused by Shrimp Daddy, Dim-Sumthin' Special, Sir Dumpling, and the Burnt Meatballs).

  / Kayla
 
 Kayla is Chase's 8-year-old sister who fights with Coco for Chase's attention. She is usually seen guarding the Mobile Attack Cuisine Cart (or M.A.C. Cart for short). Her Foodon is Omelet who is usually out.

  / Chef Jack
 
 Chef Jack is a Master Chef and the father of Chase and Kayla. He's the leader of the Rebel Chef who fight against King Gorgeous Gorge. At the time of his disappearance, he disguised himself and called himself Chef John (known as Clown in the original version) to help out Chase on different occasions until his mask was destroyed during the final fight with Rose Marinade. His Foodon's Tofurious. While disguised as Chef John, he used Shark-Fin Soup on occasion.

  / Oslo
 
 Oslo is a Grub Guru and was King of All Food until his student King Gorge reverted him to a short man who rides on a floating saucer. He has trained Chef Jack and is training Chase to become a Master Chef.

  / Pie Tin
 
 Pie Tin is a 6-year-old boy from Horai whose parents were captured by the Glutton Gormandizers. He joins Chase to rescue them and fight King Gorge. His Foodon is Sir Dumpling.

  / Coco
 
 Coco is a sneaky masked ninja girl who wears a wok on her head and is a student of Chef John. Chase first met her on Banana Island. Coco later became friends with him and fights with Kayla for his attention upon developing a crush on him. Her Foodons are Doughnut-So, Ham Scam-Witch, and Tater Tons. On occasion, Coco would use her wok for offensive attacks.

  / Albert
 
 Albert is a chef who Chase and Pie Tin meet at a Foodon Tournament. He is a fan of Chef Jack and later helps Chase on occasion until he joins Chase's group following Rose Marinade's defeat. His Foodons are Cowboyritto, Spaghettabout-It, and Crab Quake.

Glutton Empire
  / King Gorgeous Gorge
 
 The primary antagonist of the series. King Gorgeous Gorge was one of Oslo's students and the one responsible for transforming Oslo to what he is now. He was also responsible for turning Dia into Clawdia and her animal lab partners into his Big 4. Gorgeous Gorge became King Gorgeous Gorge and started the Glutton Empire to take over the world. He even managed to establish Gorge Town. After his Big 4 and Clawdia have failed to stop Chase and his friends, King Gorge took matters into his own hands. When it came to the final battle, he used the power of the Dark Nebula to create Devouron the Foodon Embodiment of Evil. When Oslo gave Chase and his Foodons the ability to become Palator the Foodon Embodiment of Good, he destroyed Devouron and defeated King Gorge cleansing him of evil. His Foodons are Fowligator, Sir Loin, Steak King, Multiprawns, Screwdles, Flyin' Flapjacks, Seafood Impastas, Sushi Ship, and Snack Attack.

  / Clawdia
 
 Dia is a young rocket scientist who was turned into a humanoid cat with pink fur named Clawdia by King Gorge who also transformed her animal lab partners into Gorge's Big 4. She will try to stop Chase and Chef Jack on their quest to stop Don Cook. She has often followed orders of each of the Big 4 which always ended in failure. After each of the Big 4 were returned to their original forms, Clawdia asked King Gorge to give her a chance to prove herself to him as Don Cook lent her Sir Loin and Steak King. She eventually failed and was mortally zapped by King Gorge. Chase was able to use his fried rice to restore her to Dia. She helps Chase by giving him an Eggplant Rocket needed to reach King Gorge in space. Her Foodons are Beefsteak, Boulder Broth, Sgt. Side-Order, Noodle-Ator, Applegator, Chowderheads, Bearafooda, Doughnasour, Digestor, and Pasta Vazoomin.

  / Cinnamonkey
 
 Formerly a green monkey that worked with Dia, Cinnamonkey is a member of King Gorgeous Gorge's Big 4. He was the one who turned Jambalydia's granddaughter Tureen into his Glutton servant. His final campaign revolved around him invading Marmaland. When Shisk-Ka-Beast is defeated, Fruit Turtle restored Cinnamonkey to his true form. His Foodon is Shish-Ka-Beast and his name is a pun on "cinnamon."

  / Cole Slawter
 
 Formerly a blue bear that worked with Dia, Cole Slawter is a member of King Gorgeous Gorge's Big 4 who specializes in seafood Foodons and plotted to turn Chase into a Glutton. That failed and Fruit Turtle reverted him back to normal after it defeated Octopoison and Squid-Vicious. His Foodons are Sizzler, Octopoison, and Squid-Vicious. His name is a pun on "coleslaw."

  / Rose Marinade
 
 Formerly a two-tailed fox who worked with Dia, Rose Marinade's is a member of King Gorgeous Gorge's Big 4. One time, she turned Kayla and Pie Tin into Gluttons by using Apple Pie seasoned with Glutton Magic while she was disguised as an old lady. After she failed, King Gorgeous Gorge's vision in the sky reverted her back to her true form. Her Foodons are Spring Roll Chicken, Dim-Sumthin' Wild, Dim-Sumthin' Blue, Dim-Sumthin' Else, and a team of Dim-Sumthin' Specials. All of Dim-Sumthin' fuse together into Dim-Sumthin' Deluxe, a Foodon Deluxe. After Dim-Sumthin' Deluxe was defeated, a vision of King Gorge appeared in the sky and punished Rose Marinade by turning her back into a two-tailed fox.

 
 
 Formerly a bat with a mechanical eye that worked with Dia, Grill is a cyborg who is the fourth member of King Gorgeous Gorge's Big 4 and the most powerful of the bunch. He tried to use his Butcherbot to assist King Gorgeous Gorge's world domination plot. Grill is also shown to assume a more cybernetic form in battle. After Gazmacho, Scarinara, and Gobblebot destroyed his cyborg form, he re-emerged back to his normal bat form. His Foodons are Tank 'N' Cheese, Mouse Special, Shakin' Bacon, Scarinara, and Gobblebot.

 Mussels Marinara
 A high-ranking member of the Glutton Empire. Mussels Marinara faced off against Chase in the preliminary round of the Floating Foodon Tournament and lost. He had Gorge's Big Four evacuated from the Glutton's ocean base with him driving their boat out of there and hasn't been seen since Chef Jack crashed Spring Chicken into the Glutton's ocean base. His Foodon is Shrimp Stompura.

 Glutton Gormandizers
 They serve as the foot soldiers of the Glutton Empire.

Other characters
 Master Flambé
 Years ago, Master Flambé was a great chef who served Princess Cupcake. When she ordered Master Flambé to make her a pizza, he got to work in perfecting one. Unfortunately, Princess Cupcake got impatient and went into town for one. This ended up depressing Master Flambé. Some years later, his Foodons Slice and Frenchy Le Toast roam in his abandoned mansion in the Flambé Forest. Clawdia had tricked Slice and Frenchy into abducting Kayla in order to attack Chase. When Master Flambé's ghost arrived, Clawdia took flight as the ghost mistook Kayla as Princess Cupcake (as both of them had the same hair style). When Kayla enjoyed Master Flambé's pizza, the ghost left to the afterlife with his Foodons.

 Barb & Cue
 These two young chefs were participants of the Floating Foodon Tournament and lost to Albert. Their Foodons are the Swede Demons and their names are a pun on "barbecue."

 Chef Salvador
 A Spanish chef that participated on the Floating Foodon Tournament and lost to Kima. His Foodon is Pilaf.

 Chet
 A young chef that participated in the Floating Foodon Tournament. He defeated Pie Tin, but lost to Chase. He is later revealed to have a grandfather named Crock Pop. His Foodons are Juice Man, Pound Cake, and Rap Scallion.

 E. Claire
 A young female chef that participated on the Floating Foodon Tournament and lost to Chase. She seems to be very popular with the boys. Her Foodon is Puddington and her name is a pun of "éclair."

 Kima
 A young chef in a grass skirt with a palm tree on his head. He participated in the Floating Foodon Tournament where he defeated Chef Salvador but lost to Albert. It was later revealed that he was a servant of King Hungry the Ate. His Foodons are Curry-Up, Gravyator, and Tropical Punch.

 Jambalydia
 An old lady who wears a pot of jambalaya on her head. She is a part of an underground network called the Hot Peppers. During one mission, she lost her granddaughter Tureen to Cinnamonkey. When collaborating with Chase to free Kayla, Pie Tin, Oslo, and Albert, Jambalydia was able to use her jambalaya trick to break the Glutton spell on Tureen. In the video game, Jambalydia was originally a Foodon and based on the Bibimbap.

 Tureen
 Jambalydia's blond-haired granddaughter with black horns. She sports a large steak on her shoulders and a Shabu-shabu as part of her dress. When Tureen and Jambalydia were spying on the Gluttons, Jambalydia's stench gave them away and they ended up captured. Jambalydia got away, but Tureen was turned into a Glutton by Cinnamonkey where her appearance lacked the steak and Shabu-shabu parts of her and wearing a female version of the Glutton Gormandizer outfit. When Kayla and the others were looking for Chase (who went missing after the destruction of the Glutton's ocean base) and Chef Jack (who was posing as Chef John at the time), they ended up captured by Tureen and the Glutton Gormandizers and taken to a Glutton base in the mountains. Tureen also helped Clawdia in the creation of Chowderheads. When Chase came to the rescue, Jambalydia used her powers to break the spell on Tureen. Like Jambalydia, Tureen was originally a Foodon in the "Bistro Recipe" games going by the name of "Shabu Shabu."

 Crock Pop
 Chet's grandfather. He runs a boot camp called Gruel Academy for Foodon chefs that Chase once went to. It was attacked by Clawdia who wanted to steal a secret scroll that contained the training secrets of the Elite Chefs held there.

 Mayor Slim Rations
 The Mayor of Dusty Town. He and his fellow citizens were suspicious of Chase and Co. when they wanted to try the secret salsa called the Salsa Especial and had them imprisoned. Following an attempted raid by the Foodon Banditos to get the salsa, Chase and the other escaped. When he asked Sheriff Zuke Squash what would happen if anything happened to the Salsa Especial, Zuke quotes that they could make more. Mayor Slim Rations reminded him that they can't since they lost the recipe. When Clawdia attacked the town with Doughnasour in order to steal the Salsa Especial and give it to King Gorge's scientists, Chase and the Foodon Banditos worked together to stop Clawdia and Doughnasour which resulted in Tacquito getting injured saving the Mayor. To show his kindness, Mayor Slim Rations used the salsa to help Tacquito recover.

 King Hungry the Ate
 The king of Marmaland. He's not very bright and thought he could become a Dishwizard just by announcing it and making merchandise. He created Fruit Turtle and allowed it to go with Chase. He is known for saying "Not a problem" when it comes to a problem that isn't a big one.

 Davey Gravy
 Chef Jack's old friend and legendary chef who has given up fighting a long time ago. When it came to creating a Deluxe Foodon, Chef Jack asked for Davey's help into having Davey's Foodon Shrimp Daddy participate. When Clawdia and Grill attacked and destroyed his house with Tank 'n' Cheese, Shrimp Daddy protected his master. After Feastivus defeated them, Davey Gravy let Shrimp Daddy go with Chase.

 Olive
 A fellow Hot Peppers agent and friend of Jambalydia. When Grill abducted the real Olive, he sent a robot duplicate of her to spy on Jambalydia. Clawdia mistook the robot duplicate for the real one when she tried to prove herself to Grill.

Media

Manga

Anime

Episodes

Reception
Neil Genzlinger of Food and Wine magazine wrote that it was "an exceedingly odd" and that "The show makes Iron Chef seem tame."

References

External links
 Enoki Films Fighting Foodons homepage
 
 

1998 manga
2001 anime television series debuts
Japanese children's animated adventure television series
Japanese children's animated fantasy television series
Adventure anime and manga
Cooking in anime and manga
Discotek Media
Fantasy anime and manga
Group TAC
Kodansha manga
NHK original programming
Shōnen manga
Animated television series about children